Núria Albó i Corrons (born 1930) is a Spanish writer, teacher, and politician. She is a Creu de Sant Jordi and Premi Vila de'Arenys laureate.

Early life
Albó was born on 2 July 1930 in La Garriga near Barcelona. Her father was killed on 18 September 1936 during the Spanish Civil War. She was not able to have a normal education because of the war, but her mother created home schooling for Albó and her four siblings. Albó's love of music was supported by her mother, who arranged for her to learn the piano.

Albó supplemented her education by reading novels by Hans Christian Andersen and those illustrated by the Spanish Lola Anglada and the English Arthur Rackham. Even as a child, she tried to read books that were written in the language Catalan and this partnered her first experiments with writing.

Career
She began her studies in philosophy at the University of Barcelona, in 1948, but left before finishing. She returned later and received a degree in pedagogy in 1962. She won her first literary prize in 1958. In 1962 she published a poetry collection with La mà pel front, releasing another ten years later entitled Díptic with Maria Àngels Anglada,
with a foreword by Marià Manent and illustrations by Ricard Creus.

A teacher for 20 years, she was elected mayor of La Garriga in 1979. Her 1980 novel, Desencis ("Disillusion") was awarded the Premi Vila de'Arenys. A political novel set during elections, her characters are described as "contradictory" and "tender, intelligent and sometimes lucid, but at the same time conformist and passive." She is a contemporary of Maria Àngels Anglada, Maria Aurèlia Capmany, Clementina Arderiu, Rosa Leveroni, and Maria Beneyto.

Personal life
Albó is married to Guillermo Serra with whom she has four children, Mireia, Guillem, Oriol, and Judit. She received the Creu de Sant Jordi Award in 2012.

Selected works

Poems 
La mà pel front (1962) 
Díptic, (1972) with Maria Àngels Anglada.
L’encenedor verd, (1979)

Children's books 
El fantasma Santiago (1979)

Novels 
Fes-te repicar (1979) 
Agapi mou (1980) 
Desencís (1980)
Tranquil, Jordi, tranquil (1983)
Grills (1983)

References

Bibliography

1930 births
Living people
People from Vallès Oriental
Spanish women novelists
Spanish women poets
Spanish schoolteachers
Women writers from Catalonia
Women mayors of places in Spain
Novelists from Catalonia
Poets from Catalonia
Spanish women children's writers
University of Barcelona alumni
20th-century Spanish novelists
20th-century Spanish poets
20th-century Spanish women writers
Spanish children's writers
Mayors of places in Catalonia
20th-century Spanish educators
21st-century Spanish educators
Spanish women educators
20th-century women educators
21st-century women educators